"Habibi Oud" (Return my Darling) is an Amal Hijazi single from her debut album Akher Gharam.

The ballad, expressing loyalty in a relationship, was a success in Lebanon and it debuted at number one in the country, making it Hijazi's third consecutive number one single there, after "Akher Gharam" and "Rayyah Balak". In addition, "Habibi Oud" was a number hit in countries like Syria, Jordan and Egypt, becoming one of Hijazi's greatest hits.

As one of Hijazi's most popular songs, the song was prominent in all of her concerts.

Two different scenes of the music video of "Habibi Oud" exist. At first, Hijazi is singing on a platform, as if in a private performance as she sings about her lover. Other scenes show her singing solo in front of a band of dancers behind various colourful backgrounds.

Even years after its release, "Habibi Oud" is still considered to be one of Hijazi's most artistic songs, according to most critics.

2001 singles
Amal Hijazi songs
2000 songs